Isaac Saviñón, known as Panky, is an actor, film producer, writer, radio and TV host, announcer, and singer from the Dominican Republic.

Panky is the lead singer of the Dominican rock band Metropolitan.

In 2010 he was elected by Luz García's Noche de Luz programme as a "Summer's Hot Body".

Career

Radio
¿Cual es tu versión? on Fidelity 94.1 FM

Filmography

Discography

References

External links 

Living people

Dominican Republic people of Italian descent
Dominican Republic radio personalities
Dominican Republic male film actors

Year of birth missing (living people)
White Dominicans